The Shallot aphid (Myzus ascalonicus) is an aphid in the superfamily Aphidoidea in the order Hemiptera. It is a true bug and sucks sap from plants.

Economic importance
This aphid is known to attack many economically important plants such as cucumber, pumpkin, cabbage, broccoli, cauliflower, turnip, strawberry, Chrysanthemum, and Tulipa.

References 

 influentialpoints.com
 
 academia.edu
 naturespot.org.uk

Agricultural pest insects
Hemiptera of Asia
Macrosiphini